Dasarki, aka Goth Daseri, is a village and deh in Shaheed Fazil Rahu taluka of Badin District, Sindh. As of 2017, it has a population of 2,761, in 498 households. It is part of the tapedar circle of Agri.

References 

Populated places in Badin District